Alfonso XIII was a  first-class protected cruiser of the Spanish Navy which served in the Spanish fleet from 1896 until the early years of the 20th century.

Technical characteristics
Alfonso XIII was built at the naval shipyard at Ferrol in Spain. Laid down in 1891, she was launched on 31 August 1891. In 1896, she entered service in a partially completed state as a training ship. She finally was fully completed and commissioned on 18 May 1900.

The ships of the class were intended to have heavy armament and high speed on a small displacement. The lead ship, although otherwise considered excellent, had proven top-heavy, so changes were made to Alfonso XIII to address this, including a smaller main gun. However, the changes, intended to improve upon Reina Regente, instead left Alfonso XIII lightly armed, slow, and still unstable in heavy seas.

The Hontoria-built 7.9-inch (201 mm) guns were in single mounts on the broadside fore and aft, while the  guns were in a central battery amidships. All five torpedo tubes were fixed and above the waterline, with two forward, one on each broadside, and one aft.

Operational history
Alfonso XIII was not yet fully complete when she entered service as a training ship in 1896. Still incomplete at the time of the Spanish–American War, she was sent to Cadiz on 7 May 1898 to join the Spanish Navy's 2nd Squadron, under the command of Rear Admiral Manuel de Camara, then forming for a voyage to the Philippines. Due to her incomplete condition, Camara decided to leave her behind at Cadiz when his squadron departed on 16 June 1898 on its abortive voyage. Alfonso XIII spent the rest of the war in Spanish waters to defend Spain's coast from a potential attack by the United States Navy.

After the war, Alfonso XIII finally was completed on 18 May 1900, and she was commissioned the same day. Her shortcomings in seaworthiness led her to having a short career, and she was soon stricken and scrapped.

Notes

References
Chesneau, Roger, and Eugene M. Kolesnik, Eds. Conway's All The World's Fighting Ships 1860–1905. New York, New York: Mayflower Books Inc., 1979. .
Nofi, Albert A. The Spanish–American War, 1898. Conshohocken, Pennsylvania:Combined Books, Inc., 1996. .

External links
 The Spanish–American War Centennial Website: ''Alfonso XIII'

Reina Regente-class cruisers
Ships built in Spain
1891 ships
Spanish–American War cruisers of Spain